is a Japanese manga series written and illustrated by Fujiko F. Fujio published from 1968 to 1969 in the Shogakukan magazine Weekly Shōnen Sunday. Set in the same universe as Doraemon, and predating that work by only one year, the manga was then made in a TV anime series by the animation studio Shin-Ei Animation in 1991. From the manga also two animated films were made: 21 Emon: Uchū e Irasshai! and 21 Emon: Uchū Ike! Hadashi no Princess. The official English name is 21 Emon: The 21st Century Kid.

The manga, set in a science fiction 2018, tells the story of 18-year-old 21 Emon, heir to a long dynasty of hotel owners, whose ancestor goes back to the Tokugawa shogunate. The anime, unlike the manga, is set between 2051 and 2071.

The robot character Gonsuke would go on to make numerous cameo appearances in the 2005 Doraemon series.

Plot

Manga
Having to struggle with keeping up their family hotel business at the age of 18, 21 Emon is trying his hardest to help out his family as the new heir, although his dream is not being in the hotel business his whole life but exploring the wide space as a space pilot.

Anime
The plot is the same as the manga, but with changes. Although 21 Emon is 18 in the manga, he is around 11–13 years old in the anime adaptation.

References

External links

1968 manga
1981 anime films
1991 anime television series debuts
1992 anime films
Anime series based on manga
Fiction set in 2018
Fujiko F Fujio
Shin-Ei Animation
Shogakukan franchises
Shogakukan manga
Shōnen manga
TV Asahi original programming